American heavy metal band Five Finger Death Punch has released nine studio albums, two compilation albums, one extended play (EP), 33 singles and 24 music videos. Formed in Las Vegas, Nevada in 2005, the group features vocalist Ivan Moody, rhythm guitarist Zoltan Bathory, lead guitarist Andy James, bassist Chris Kael. and drummer Charlie Engen. In 2007, the band released its debut album The Way of the Fist, which reached number 107 on the Billboard 200 and was certified gold by the Recording Industry Association of America (RIAA). All three singles from the album reached the top 20 of the Billboard Mainstream Rock Songs chart. After Hook replaced previous guitarist Darrell Roberts, 5FDP released War Is the Answer in 2009 which reached the top ten of the Billboard 200 and was certified platinum by the RIAA. Four singles from the album reached the Mainstream Rock top ten, while the band's cover of "Bad Company" was certified platinum.

In 2010, 5FDP's original bassist Matt Snell was replaced by Kael, and the following year saw the release of the band's third album American Capitalist. It peaked at number 3 on the Billboard 200, reached the top ten of the Canadian Albums Chart, and was certified platinum in the US and gold in Canada, respectively. Lead single "Under and Over It" was the band's first to register on the Billboard Hot 100, reaching number 77, while three singles from the album reached the top ten of the Mainstream Rock chart. In 2013 the band released two studio albums – The Wrong Side of Heaven and the Righteous Side of Hell, Volume 1 and Volume 2 – both of which debuted at number 2 on the Billboard 200. Volume 1 was the first release by the band to reach the top five of the Canadian Albums Chart, peaking at number 3, and the top 40 of the UK Albums Chart, peaking at number 21. The first single from each album – "Lift Me Up" (featuring Rob Halford) and "Battle Born" – topped the Mainstream Rock chart in the US.

Five Finger Death Punch's sixth studio album Got Your Six was released in 2015, becoming the third consecutive release by the band to debut at number 2 on the Billboard 200. The album was also their first to reach the top ten of both the Australian Albums Chart and the UK Albums Chart, as well as a number of other regions. All four singles from Got Your Six reached the top five of the Mainstream Rock chart, with "Wash It All Away" becoming the band's fourth number one on the chart.

Studio albums

Compilation albums

Extended play

Singles

Other charted songs

Music videos

Footnotes

References

External links
Five Finger Death Punch official website
Five Finger Death Punch discography at AllMusic
Five Finger Death Punch discography at Discogs
Five Finger Death Punch discography at MusicBrainz

Heavy metal group discographies
Discographies of American artists